Ratbag Hero is a 1991 Australian mini series based on the book A Riverman's Story by Mik Kelsall.

References

External links
Ratbag Hero at IMDb

1990s Australian television miniseries
1991 Australian television series debuts
1991 Australian television series endings